is the eighth single by the Japanese idol group Idoling. As well as the normal single, it was released in an A and B limited edition format, each containing its own DVD. Version A contains the Mujōken Kōfuku PV, as well as filming the photo-shoot for the jacket photos and for the video itself. Version B contains the baby blue PV, as well as "making of" filming of the video. Special trading cards were included with the normal edition, with eighteen in each copy. Mujōken Kōfuku was used as the ending song of Fuji TV's "Raion no Gokigenyō" from 29 June 2009 until 25 September 2009. Its highest position on the Oricon chart was #5.

Track listings

CD
 
 
 U

DVD
Limited Edition A
 Mujōken Kōfuku (PV)
 Mujōken Kōfuku (PV & CD - Jacket Photography & "Making of" Filming)

Limited Edition B
 baby blue (PV)
 baby blue (PV - "Making of" Filming)

External links
 Pony Canyon - Mujōken Kōfuku (Edition A) : Idoling!!! (Japanese)
 Pony Canyon - Mujōken Kōfuku (Edition B) : Idoling!!! (Japanese)
 Pony Canyon - Mujōken Kōfuku (Normal Trading Cards - 18 types per copy) : Idoling!!! (Japanese)

2009 singles
Idoling!!! songs
2009 songs
Pony Canyon singles